Benareby is a locality situated in Härryda Municipality, Västra Götaland County, Sweden. It had 384 inhabitants in 2010.

References 

Populated places in Västra Götaland County
Populated places in Härryda Municipality